The 2011 Nigerian Senate election in Federal Capital Territory was held on April 9, 2011, to elect the member of the Nigerian Senate to represent the Federal Capital Territory. Philips Tanimu Aduda representing FCT Senatorial District won on the platform of Peoples Democratic Party.

Overview

Summary

Results

FCT Senatorial District 
Peoples Democratic Party candidate Philips Tanimu Aduda won the election, defeating Congress for Progressive Change candidate Musa Abari and other party candidates.

References

April 2011 events in Nigeria
Federal Capital Territory Senate elections
2011 Nigerian Senate elections